Bill Taylor was a member of the Ohio House of Representatives from 1995 to 2000.  His district consisted of a portion of Lorain County, Ohio.  He was elected in the 1994 election with a margin of only 12 votes. He was succeeded by J. Tom Lendrum.

References

Republican Party members of the Ohio House of Representatives
Living people
Year of birth missing (living people)